Drabiv is an urban-type settlement located in Zolotonosha Raion of Cherkasy Oblast (province) in central Ukraine. It hosts the administration of Drabiv settlement hromada, one of the hromadas of Ukraine. Population: 

Until 18 July 2020, Drabiv served as an administrative center of Drabiv Raion. The raion was abolished in July 2020 as part of the administrative reform of Ukraine, which reduced the number of raions of Cherkasy Oblast to four. The area of Drabiv Raion was merged into Zolotonosha Raion.

The settlement is located in the upper reaches of the Zolotonoshka river, a tributary of the Dnipro,  from the regional center town – Cherkasy,   from Drabovo-Bariatynske railway station.

History
The first written mention about Drabiv was made in 1680th year, when rich cossack and later Pereyaslav Colonel Ivan Myrovych had taken lands with small khutir, (which was there for a long time before) from a free military steppe on the river Zolotonoshka. Myrovych appealed to Czar to issue him a deed for ownership of the estate. In 1691 he received the deed on the khutir with pond, forest, pastures and hayfields.
In 1707 khutir consisted of 7 houses. During the Northern war Ivan Myrovych's son – Fedir Myrovych, together with Mazepa joined the Swedish side. After Sweden's defeat, in accordance with the decree issued by Peter I in 1718, all estates of Myrovych's family, including khutir Drabiv were transferred to duke Kantakuzen.

In 1738 the widow of Kantakuzen handed over Drabiv to the Czar's treasury. In 1775 Catherine II granted Drabiv into the eternal and hereditary possession of count Peter Zavadovsky.
In 1843 Zavadovsky family sold Drabiv to Baryatynsky.
In 1848 Drabiv was granted the status of a market town, it becomes the volost center with 4700 residents.

In January 1989 the population was 7713 people.

In January 2013 the population was 6705 people.

People from Drabiv 
 Yevhen Novak (born 1989), Ukrainian footballer
 Oleh Synyohub (born 1989), Ukrainian footballer

References

External links
 https://web.archive.org/web/20090203090601/http://oblrada.ck.ua/drabiv/index.htm

Urban-type settlements in Zolotonosha Raion
Zolotonoshsky Uyezd